The buff-thighed puffleg (Haplophaedia assimilis) is a species of hummingbird in the "brilliants", tribe Heliantheini in subfamily Lesbiinae. It is found in Bolivia and Peru.

Taxonomy and systematics

The buff-thighed puffleg was for a time considered to be a subspecies of greenish puffleg (H. aureliae) but was then returned to full species status. As of early 2022 it is again under consideration for reinclusion in H. aureliae but the proposal does not have much support. It has two recognized subspecies, the nominate H. a. assimilis and H. a. affinis.

Description

It has a straight blackish bill. Adults of both sexes of the nominate subspecies are mostly dark green and have a slightly forked blue-black tail. Their namesake leg puffs are creamy buff to whitish. H. a. affinis is a darker green overall and has a bluer tail; its leg puffs are pale rufous. Juveniles are like adults with the addition of brown fringes on the feathers of the head and neck.

Distribution and habitat

Subspecies H. a. affinis of the buff-thighed puffleg is the more northerly of the two. It is found on the eastern slope of the Andes in northern and central Peru. The nominate H. a. assimilis is found from the eastern Andean slope of Peru's Department of Cuzco southeast into central Bolivia as far as Cochabamba Department. It inhabits the undergrowth and edges of humid to wet pre-montane forest. In elevation it ranges between  but seldom occurs above .

Behavior

Movement

The buff-thighed puffleg is thought to seasonally disperse to the lower parts of its elevational range.

Feeding

The buff-thighed puffleg mostly feeds near the ground, taking nectar from small groups of flowers. It is territorial and defends clusters of flowering bushes. In addition to nectar, it feeds on insects that it usually gleans from leaves but occasionally catches by hawking from a perch.

Breeding

Almost nothing is known about the buff-thighed puffleg's breeding phenology. It is known that the female alone incubates the clutch of two white eggs.

Vocalization

What is thought to be the buff-thighed puffleg's song is "a repeated single strident note 'tsuk...tsuk...tsuk...'... occasionally interspersed by a double-noted 'tsi-tsuk'". It also makes "a dry rattle and some chattering notes in series."

Status

The IUCN has assessed the buff-thighed puffleg as being of Least Concern, though its population size is not known and is believed to be decreasing. It appears to be "generally fairly common" though H. a. affinis is known from only a few localities.

References

buff-thighed puffleg
Birds of the Peruvian Andes
Birds of the Bolivian Andes
buff-thighed puffleg
Taxonomy articles created by Polbot